Dato' Sri Subahan bin Kamal (Jawi: صبحان بن كمال; born 26 December 1965) is a Malaysian businessman, sports executive and former politician. He has held numerous board and senior management roles at Malaysian-based companies. Kamal currently holds board positions at two Bursa Malaysia-listed companies. He serves as Chairman at Can-One Berhad, and is Independent Non-Executive Chairman at Alcom Group. He also serves as Executive Director of ACE Market-listed Gagasan Nadi Cergas Berhad. Kamal presently serves as Executive Chairman of FBE Ventures, an F&B company based in Kuala Lumpur, Malaysia. He also previously served as a member of the United Malays National Organisation (UMNO) party.

As a sports executive, Kamal is currently the President of the Malaysian Hockey Confederation. He began as deputy Chairman of Selangor Hockey Association in 2009, becoming the Chairman in 2011, he also served Malaysian Hockey Confederation Chairman, holding both roles until 2017. He held the position of President of the Football Association of Selangor until July 2018. He also served as the Deputy Chairman of the Malaysian FA between 2017-2021.

Career

Early career
Kamal worked at Bank Rakyat from 1989 until 1994 where he joined the corporate planning department. In 1994, he started working as the private secretary to the parliamentary secretary of Ministry of Finance until 1995. He then became the senior private secretary to the Deputy Finance Minister from 1995 to 1998, serving Affifudin Omar, Wong See Wah and Mohamed Nazri Abdul Aziz respectively. Kamal became senior private secretary to the Deputy Human Resource Minister, Afifudin Omar in 1999. In later part of 1999, he left the civil sector to start his business in construction, however, his relationships with various government agencies and departments remain strong and relevant till today.

Sports executive & roles
Kamal's roles in sport began in 2009, when he was invited to join the Selangor Hockey Association and was voted in as Deputy Chairman. He remained in the role for two years before he was voted in as Chairman. While in the position, Kamal re-introduced the Selangor Hockey League (SHL) and focused on a new regional tournament. Stadia was also improved in the region.

In 2015, he became the President of the Malaysian Hockey Confederation after winning an unchallenged race for the position. In 2017, it was announced that Kamal would become President of the Football Association of Selangor. Around the same time, Kamal also became the Deputy Chairman at the Football Association of Malaysia. He held the role at Selangor FA for a year before announcing the would be leaving the role due to other commitments, with the FAM and MHC.

He is also the President of Petaling Jaya City FC. In 2021, he announced that he would not be seeking reelection as Deputy at Football Association of Malaysia.

Election results

Honours
  :
  Knight Companion of the Order of the Crown of Pahang (DIMP) – Dato'
  Grand Knight of the Order of Sultan Ahmad Shah of Pahang (SSAP) – Dato' Sri (2011)
  :
  Officer of the Order of the Defender of State (DSPN) – Dato' (2022)

References

1965 births
People from Selangor
Living people
United Malays National Organisation politicians
Malaysian people of Malay descent
Malaysian Muslims
Members of the Selangor State Legislative Assembly